Edward Wayne Edwards (June 14, 1933 – April 7, 2011) was an  American serial killer. Edwards escaped from jail in Akron, Ohio, in 1955 and fled across the country, holding up gas stations. By 1961, he was on the FBI's Ten Most Wanted Fugitives list.

Edwards was captured and arrested in Atlanta, Georgia on January 20, 1962. After he was granted parole in 1967, Edwards murdered at least five people between 1977 and 1996, and he is suspected of several additional killings.

Background
Edwards was born in Akron, Ohio in 1933. In his autobiography Edwards wrote that he grew up in an orphanage, and that he was abused both physically and emotionally by nuns there.

Edwards was allowed out of juvenile detention to join the U.S. Marines, but he eventually went  and was dishonorably discharged. He traveled frequently during his 20s and 30s, working assorted jobs such as working as a ship docker, vacuum cleaner retailer and handyman.

In 1955, Edwards escaped from a jail in Akron and drifted around the country robbing gas stations. He wrote that he never disguised himself during these crimes because he wanted to be famous. He was placed on the FBI's 10 Most Wanted list in 1961. After his 1962 capture, he was imprisoned in Leavenworth, from which he was paroled in 1967. Edwards claimed that the influence of a benevolent guard at Leavenworth reformed him. He married and became a motivational speaker.

Edwards appeared on two television shows, To Tell the Truth (1972) and What's My Line? He wrote an autobiography, The Metamorphosis of a Criminal: The True Life Story of Ed Edwards, in 1972. By 1982 he had returned to crime, and was imprisoned in Pennsylvania for two years for arson.

Between 1974 and 2009, Edwards lived in more than a dozen different states when not incarcerated, according to his daughter April, using many false names.

In a 1993 letter to the FBI found in his papers, Edwards requested his criminal and history records for cities in 19 states, claimed that J. Edgar Hoover "more or less gave me permission to proceed" with his 1972 autobiography "after I assured him there was nothing in it bad about the FBI" and he was writing a new book about criminals he met while incarcerated, such as Tony Provenzano, Charles Manson and Jimmy Hoffa.

Arrest and conviction 
In 2009, Edwards was arrested for murder in Louisville, Kentucky. Neighbors described him as pleasant and neighborly. In 2010, he pleaded guilty to the murders of Billy Lavaco, 21, of Doylestown, Ohio; Judith Straub, 18, of Sterling, Ohio; and Tim Hack, 19, and Kelly Drew, 19, both of Jefferson, Wisconsin.

Soon after, in a jailhouse interview, Edwards confessed to killing his foster son, Dannie Law Gloeckner, 25. In 2011, he was sentenced to death for that killing.

Known murders
The first murders for which Edwards was convicted, took place in Ohio in 1977. William ″Billy″ Lavaco, 21, of Doylestown, Ohio and his girlfriend Judith Straub, 18, of Sterling, Ohio, had been dating eight months when Straub’s car was found in the parking lot of Silver Creek Metro Park on Aug. 7, 1977, her purse and shoes inside. Family members gathered in the lot the next day as Norton police, aided by a National Guard helicopter, searched the high weeds. There, they found Lavaco and Straub, lying on the ground, shot at point-blank range with a 20-gauge shotgun. He received life sentences for these crimes in 2010.

The second pair of murders, another double homicide, occurred in Concord, Wisconsin in 1980 when Tim Hack and Kelly Drew were stabbed and strangled. These were referred to as the "Sweetheart Murders." Edwards had been questioned at the time, but there was no basis to hold him. Almost 29 years later, his connection to the crime was established by means of DNA testing. Edwards' own child, April Balascio, tipped off police about his possible involvement.

Edwards confessed to the 1996 murder of his foster son, 25-year-old Dannie Boy Edwards in Burton, Ohio. The victim had lived with Edwards and his family for several years. Dannie's original name was Dannie Law Gloeckner. Edwards murdered Gloeckner in a scheme to collect $250,000 insurance money. Dannie Boy, a soldier in the U.S. Army, was persuaded by Edwards to go AWOL from the Army and taken by him to the woods near his house in Burton, Ohio. There, Edwards shot him twice in the face, killing him, and left his body in a shallow grave, where it was later discovered by a hunter. Edwards was sentenced to death for this crime in March 2011. He died in prison of natural causes a month later.

Other possible murders
According to Phil Stanford in his book The Peyton-Allan Files, Edwards may have been responsible for the murders of Beverly Allan and Larry Peyton in Portland, Oregon, in 1960. Two men were arrested and imprisoned for these murders, but released from prison early. Authorities maintain that the correct persons were prosecuted.

In March 2017, Detective Chad Garcia of the Jefferson County Sheriff's Office who was in charge of the "Sweetheart Murders" case described how the murders of Hack and Drew were solved following a tip off from Edwards' daughter. Garcia said he was "pretty confident" there are at least five to seven more murders Edwards committed and "who knows beyond that." He gave a list of 15 confirmed and suspected victims, adding that he was less sure Edwards was involved in the Zodiac killings.

Retired homicide detective John Cameron speculated that Edwards was responsible for several high-profile cases, including the Zodiac killings in the Bay Area of California and the murder of JonBenét Ramsey. However, his claims have proven highly controversial.

Death
Edwards died of natural causes at the Corrections Medical Center in Columbus, Ohio on April 7, 2011, avoiding execution by lethal injection set for August 31.

In media
In October 1972, Edwards appeared on the television game show To Tell The Truth, claiming to be reformed and denying having committed any murders.

A former police detective and cold case investigator, J.A. Cameron published a true crime book It's Me – Edward Wayne Edwards, the serial killer you never heard of, in 2014, claiming that along with other murders Edwards hadn't confessed to, that Edwards was the Zodiac Killer. The book and Cameron's claims were "met with almost universal disdain, especially from law enforcement".

In 2017, A&E broadcast a program describing the murders of Tim Hack and Kelly Drew.

In 2018 Investigation Discovery broadcast an episode titled My Father, the Serial Killer which tells the story of how Edwards' daughter realized her father had committed the so-called "Sweetheart Murders" and tipped off authorities, leading to his arrest and conviction. The daughter told People that Edwards had a dark side, verbally and physically abusing her mother Kay, and making the children watch videos about the Zodiac Killer while screaming, "that's not how it happened!" In the episode she affirmed that she thought her father was also the Zodiac Killer.

In April 2018, A&E aired a six part series, It Was Him: The many murders of Ed Edwards. According to an article in Rolling Stone by Amelia Mcdonell-Parry, Larry Harnish, who had also researched the Black Dahlia case, ridiculed Cameron's use of a website which Cameron believes was authored by Edwards; Cameron's efforts to reach out to Kathleen Zellner, attorney for Steven Avery, were unsuccessful, but in an e‑mail Zellner doubted that Edwards could have murdered Teresa Halbach, while citing no evidence which definitively excluded him; Mcdonell-Parry claimed that Cameron embellished his theories in the A&E documentary, citing a lack of evidence that the Zodiac Killer's hood was made of leather, but also noted that Detective Chad Garcia agreed that Edwards had committed more than the five murders for which he was convicted.

A 2019 "true crime" podcast Edward Wayne Edwards. The podcast story starts with the moment Edwards' daughter April Balascio realises her father might be involved in the 'Sweetheart Murders' and includes what came after, as well as delves into Edwards' past by way of Balascio's memories.

See also 
 List of homicides in Wisconsin
List of serial killers in the United States

References

1933 births
1977 murders in the United States
2011 deaths
20th-century American criminals
American escapees
American male criminals
American people convicted of arson
American people convicted of murder
American people who died in prison custody
American prisoners sentenced to death
American prisoners sentenced to life imprisonment
American serial killers
Contestants on American game shows
Criminals from Kentucky
Criminals from Ohio
FBI Ten Most Wanted Fugitives
Fugitives
Male serial killers
Murderers for life insurance money
People convicted of murder by Ohio
People convicted of murder by Wisconsin
People from Akron, Ohio
People from Louisville, Kentucky
Prisoners sentenced to life imprisonment by Ohio
Prisoners who died in Ohio detention
Serial killers who died in prison custody